Artur Mägi (August 29, 1904 - November 9, 1981) was an Estonian legal scientist and the Chancellor of Justice of Estonia while it was in exile.

Biography 
Mägi studied at the University of Tartu, Faculty of law from 1923 to 1929.

In 1944 Mägi fled with his wife to Sweden.

From 1953 to 1963 Mägi was a lecturer at the Estonian Scientific Institute.

From 1949 to 1981 was the Chancellor of Justice of Estonia while it was in exile.

Personal life
Mägi married Lydia Taevere in 1931.

References

1904 births
1981 deaths
Estonian emigrants to Sweden
Estonian World War II refugees
University of Tartu alumni
Academic staff of the University of Tartu
People from Järva Parish
20th-century Estonian politicians
20th-century Estonian lawyers
Members of the Riiginõukogu